Eunos  Constituency was a constituency in Singapore. It used to exist from 1984 to 1988, where it merged parts of Kaki Bukit and Tampines constituencies. It was absorbed into the namesake Eunos Group Representation Constituency.

Members of Parliament

Elections

Elections in 1980s

References 

Singaporean electoral divisions